Wilhelm Egginger (b. April 6, 1912 - d. July 29, 1983) was a German ice hockey player who competed for the German national team at the 1936 Winter Olympics in Garmisch-Partenkirchen. He played club hockey for SC Riessersee.

References

1912 births
1983 deaths
German ice hockey goaltenders
Ice hockey players at the 1936 Winter Olympics
Olympic ice hockey players of Germany
Sportspeople from Garmisch-Partenkirchen